Juan Manuel Ferrari was an Uruguayan sculptor, born on Montevideo on 21 March 1874 and died in Buenos Aires on 31 October 1919.

He studied with his father, sculptor Juan Ferrari in Montevideo and in 1890 traveled to Italy to study under Ettore Ferrari in Rome with a scholarship from the government of Uruguay. Later, while still in Italy he studied under Ercole Rosa at the Royal Institute of Beaux Arts.

Ferrari returned to Uruguay in 1896 and opened his own studio. Later on he moved to Buenos Aires and in 1915 he relocated again to Rome.

Works
Among his most visible projects he made the following public monuments:

 Monument to Juan Antonio Lavalleja, Minas (1902),.
 Monument to the Battle of Las Piedras, Las Piedras (1911),.
 Monument to General San Martín's Liberation Army, under commission to Mendoza Province in Argentina, Cerro de la Gloria, (1914).

References 
 Tomo II: Plásticos uruguayos, compilado por la Biblioteca del Poder Legislativo, 1975
Juan Manuel Ferrari, 1874–1916: diciembre 1974, Montevideo, Uruguay. (Exposición de homenaje) Comisión Nacional de Artes Plásticas.
Museo Nacional de Artes Visuales de Uruguay.

1874 births
1919 deaths
Uruguayan sculptors
Male sculptors
Uruguayan male artists
Uruguayan expatriates in Italy
Uruguayan expatriates in Argentina